Goshen Municipal Airport  is a public-use civil airport three miles southeast of Goshen, in Elkhart County, Indiana. It is owned by the Goshen Board of Aviation Commissioners. The National Plan of Integrated Airport Systems for 2011–2015 categorized it as a general aviation facility.

The airport is host to America's Freedom Fest, which advertises itself as among the country's biggest single-day airshows.

Facilities
The airport covers 439 acres (178 ha) at an elevation of 827 feet (252 m). It has two runways: 9/27 is 6,050 by 100 feet (1,844 x 30 m) asphalt and 5/23 is 2,497 by 180 feet (761 x 55 m) turf.

For the 12-month period ending December 21, 2019, the airport averaged 59 aircraft movements per day, or roughly 21,535 per year. The operations are 97% general aviation and 3% air taxi.

References

External links 

 Aerial image from Indiana DOT
 Aerial image as of March 1999 from USGS The National Map
 

Airports in Indiana
Transportation buildings and structures in Elkhart County, Indiana